Henry Pointer House is a building in Thompsons Station, Tennessee that was listed on the National Register of Historic Places.  It was removed from the National Register in 2006, when it was relocated.

It was built or has other significance as of c.1885. It includes Italianate architecture.

The property was covered in a 1988 study of Williamson County historical resources.

References

Former National Register of Historic Places in Tennessee
Houses in Williamson County, Tennessee
Italianate architecture in Tennessee
Houses completed in 1885
Houses on the National Register of Historic Places in Tennessee
National Register of Historic Places in Williamson County, Tennessee